Georg Trump (10 July 1896 – 21 December 1985) was a German graphics, typeface and postage stamp designer, known for designs such as the book typeface Trump Mediaeval (1954), the slab serif City ( 1931) and the condensed, industrial Schadow.

Trump fought in both WWI and WWII, the latter which left him severely wounded. He studied under , and was a fellow lecturer with Jan Tschichold in Munich. He worked for the Berthold Type Foundry and then the Weber Type Foundry in Stuttgart.

References

External links
 Biography and type designs on the website of the Klingspor Museum
 Uses of typefaces by Georg Trump
 Postage stamps by Georg Trump
 Drawing proposal for banknote by Georg Trump
 Typedia

German typographers and type designers
Commanders Crosses of the Order of Merit of the Federal Republic of Germany
1896 births
1985 deaths
German stamp designers